The Presbyterian Secondary School, Osu was established in 1956 in one of the Old Basel Missionary Buildings at the foot of Kuku Hill of Osu. The motives of establishing the school are:
1. To offer Presbyterian Day Secondary education to children in Osu
2. To have a Secondary School at Osu in compensation for lack of a boarding school at Osu. 
It was seriously considered that the seat of the Basel Mission and Presbyterianism needed a higher school. The church and some individual educationists teamed up to establish the school with Mr. Cleland Armah as the first Headmaster of the school. In 1963, the school was absorbed into the public system under a new Headmaster Mr. McCarthy. He renovated the Old Basel Mission building into a school building accommodating two stream classrooms, library, administration office and science laboratories.
The Church offered the present site (The New Site) for the school. At the moment, the school has only an eighteen (18) unit classroom block and three storey Science block which accommodates also the staff of the school.
Currently, the school has benefited from the GETFund and new classroom blocks are being put up to accommodate the many students who continue to seek academic progress here.

History 

The Presbyterian Secondary School, Osu was established in 1956 in one of the Old Basel Missionary Buildings at the foot of Kuku Hill of Osu. The motives of establishing the school are:
1. To offer Presbyterian Day Secondary education to children in Osu
2. To have a Secondary School at Osu in compensation for lack of a boarding school at Osu. 
It was seriously considered that the seat of the Basel Mission and Presbyterianism needed a higher school. The church and some individual educationists teamed up to establish the school with Mr. Cleland Armah as the first Headmaster of the school. In 1963, the school was absorbed into the public system under a new Headmaster Mr. McCarthy. He renovated the Old Basel Mission building into a school building accommodating two stream classrooms, library, administration office and science laboratories.
The Church offered the present site (The New Site) for the school. At the moment, the school has only an eighteen (18) unit classroom block and three storey Science block which accommodates also the staff of the school.
Currently, the school has benefited from the GetFund and new classroom blocks are being put up to accommodate the many students who continue to seek academic progress here.

Mission 

It was to offer Presbyterian day secondary education to children whose parents could not afford the boarding fees of the sister school at Presbyterian Boys Senior Secondary school then located at Odumase - Krobo which was later moved to Legon. It was intended to have a secondary school at Osu in compensation for the lack of a boarding school at Osu. It was seriously considered that the seat of the Basel Mission and Presbyterianism needed a higher institution.

Head Teachers

Achievements

2018 Sprite Ball Champions 
The Presbyterian High School-Osu triumphed over Mfantsipim to win the Sprite Ball Championship for the first time
Presbyterian Senior High School (Osu PRESEC) have annexed the 2017/2018 Sprite Ball Championship after beating Mfantsipim School 25-22 in a pulsating final. The journey for Mfanstipim in the knockout phase started after beating Prempeh College 20-16 quarter final.
They then went past through Sacred Heart winning by 26-21 in the semis. Osu-Presec were glorious throughout the competition. They beat St Thomas Aquinas 18-12 in the quarter finals and got impressive in the semifinals as they beat Pope John 16-12.
Beating the four time winners of the prestigious competition, caps off a remarkable run by the little known school after going unbeaten in the tournament.
The win is PRESEC’s second straight win in this year’s competition after beating Mfantsipim 45-14 in the opening game of the 2018 edition.

The score was tied at 12 at half time with Mfantsipim ending the half on a poor run after dominating the early minutes of the game.
The final was characterized by end to end action but Presec-Osu will have Guard Prince Lumorvi to thank for the triumph as he scored from the free throw line as he got fouled on several drives to the basket.

Point Guard Joel Kobayere was named the Most Valuable Player of the Tournament. Presec-Osu won the championship after making their second appearance in the tournament in history.

Notable alumni 

 Uncle Ebo Whyte - Theatre Arts Producer
Nai Prince (9Cliche) - Musician
Nii Kpakpo Curtis - Voice over comedian
Rudolf Ofori - Mechanical Engineer (BetterMechs Ghana)

See also
PeaceJam Ghana

References

Schools in Ghana